Bielany Wrocławskie (1945–46: Strzeżawin) is a village in the administrative district of Council Gmina Kobierzyce, within Wrocław County, Lower Silesian Voivodeship, in south-western Poland. Prior to 1945 it was in Germany for a brief time, although in more than a millennium-long history of Poland it was Polish for the most of the time.

Village layout 

Demography 
According to the council data from 30.06.2017 village had a population of 3,708. It is part of the larger Wrocław metropolitan area.

Transport 
The A4 motorway and national routes 5 and 8 meet at a cloverleaf junction at Bielany Wroclawskie. In the resort, near the border with Wrocław is the largest shopping mall in Poland.

References

Villages in Wrocław County